Elongation factor RNA polymerase II-like 3 is a protein that in humans is encoded by the ELL3 gene.

References

Further reading 

 
 
 
 

Human proteins